Washington Township is the smallest of twelve townships in Harrison County, Indiana. As of the 2010 census, its population was 522 and it contained 237 housing units.

History

Washington Township's first settlers were Jacob and Henry Funk and their families who settled in the area in 1805. Their farm was located on the river flat where Indian Creek flows into the Ohio River.

In 1986, an early archaic Indian site was excavated in the western part of the township, the Swan's Landing Archeological Site.

Geography

Settlements
The only town in Washington Township is New Amsterdam, Indiana, located along the Ohio River. The unincorporated community of Valley City is also located there.

External links
 Indiana Township Association
 United Township Association of Indiana

Townships in Harrison County, Indiana
Townships in Indiana